Jidi (born June 22, 1983) is the pen name of Zu Yale, a Chinese illustrator and cartoonist. She graduated from Southwest University for Nationalities.

Her representative work is the cartoon book, "My Way" series. She has won many cartoon awards home and abroad and participated in many international art interchange activities. Now lives in Dali, Yunnan. 
Since 2004, the cartoon books, "My Way" series have been successively published, and, at present, they have been authorized to publish in France, Malaysia and other countries. Meanwhile, the "My Way"series have continuously hit the best-selling list of literature books in every well-known book city, and been recognized and loved by the readers with its sales volume stably retaining the first place of inland cartoon books. 
With her fresh and warm drawing style, appealing colors, and mild and sorrowful words, Jidi is honored as "emotional color magician" and cartoonist producing cartoon books warming people’s hearts. 
In June, 2002, Jidi, a student of department of painting in Southwest Institute for Nationalities (the predecessor of Southwest University for Nationalities), began to serialize the cartoon book, My Way, on Xinlei•STORY 100, and its gorgeous colors and delicate feelings attracted the attention of readers at once. In October, 2004, with extremely high popularity, the offprint of My Way was published. And by virtue of her fresh and warm drawing style, appealing colors, and mild and sorrowful words, it received a high opinion from readers.

Works

My Way
In this book, the audiences can see a lot of short stories. The main character is ‘V’. He is on the trip that nobody know where he wants to go. During his journey, he has met a number of lonely people who has a story in the deep of the heart, including happy thing and sorrow. Maybe V, and everyone, is looking for a way which is given into blessedness.
V travels to different places, meets different people, and sees sadness and happiness along his trip.

Tiptoe around time
The story is about a high school girl who just starts to step to adult world of confusion and her exquisite inner world. Here is Xiaolu Li’s castle and garden. She grown up in a single- parent family, looks be like very funny, often indulged in her fantasy world, but inside herself is very sensitive.

References

Douban(n.d),<Jidi> by Jidi Retrieved from http://book.douban.com/subject/4225582/

External links
 My way on Google book
 Fei xiang de mao on Google book
 Jidi's Blog

Chinese women illustrators
Chinese cartoonists
Chinese women cartoonists
1983 births
Living people